The Gift is a 2014 Irish thriller film directed by Tommy Collins. It was selected as the Irish entry for the Best Foreign Language Film at the 87th Academy Awards, but was not nominated.

Cast
 Michelle Beamish as Roisin
 Charlotte Bradley as Carmel Mcgill
 Ciarán Charles as Jack
 Dara Devaney as JJ Magill
 John Finn as Sean Og
 Owen McDonnell as Fiachra Greene
 Pól Ó Griofa as Macdara Magill
 Janusz Sheagall as Jakub Soja

See also
 List of submissions to the 87th Academy Awards for Best Foreign Language Film
 List of Irish submissions for the Academy Award for Best Foreign Language Film

References

External links
 

2014 films
2014 thriller films
Irish thriller films
Irish-language films